Prince William Victor Charles Augustus Henry Sigismund of Prussia (27 November 1896 at Kiel – 14 November 1978 at Esparza, Costa Rica), was the second son of Prince Henry of Prussia and his wife, Princess Irene of Hesse and by Rhine. He was a nephew of Kaiser Wilhelm II and Tsarina Alexandra of Russia. A great-grandson of Queen Victoria through both his parents, he was the only one of three brothers who did not have the hemophilia common among her descendants.

Life

Marriage and issue
On 11 July 1919 at Hemmelmark, he married Princess Charlotte of Saxe-Altenburg (4 March 1899 – 16 February 1989), eldest daughter of Ernst II, Duke of Saxe-Altenburg. They had two children:

 Barbara Irene Adelheid Viktoria Elisabeth Bathildis (2 August 1920 – 31 May 1994), married Duke Christian Louis of Mecklenburg
 Alfred Friedrich Ernst Heinrich Conrad (17 August 1924 – 3 June 2013)

Costa Rica
Prior to emigrating from Europe to Central America, he served as a marine officer.

In 1927, Sigismund and his family resettled in Costa Rica  three years after his son Alfred (1924–2013) had been born in Guatemala.  He planned to engage in banana and coffee planting on land he owned there.

Sigismund died in Puntarenas on 14 November 1978.

Honours and awards
Prince Sigismund received the following awards:
  Order of the Black Eagle, Knight (Kingdom of Prussia)
  Order of the Red Eagle, Grand Cross with Crown (Kingdom of Prussia)
  Order of the Prussian Crown, Grand Cross (Kingdom of Prussia)
  Royal House Order of Hohenzollern, Grand Commander (Kingdom of Prussia)
  Princely House Order of Hohenzollern, Cross of Honour 1st Class (House of Hohenzollern-Sigmaringen)

Ancestry

See also
 House of Hohenzollern
 Family tree of the German monarchs

References

Prussian princes
House of Hohenzollern
1896 births
1978 deaths
Nobility from Kiel
Imperial German Navy personnel of World War I
German expatriates in Guatemala
German expatriates in Costa Rica